Hydro from Ancient Greek word ὕδωρ (húdōr), meaning water.

Hydro may also refer to:

Energy technologies 
 Water-derived power or energy:
 Hydropower, derived from water 
 Hydroelectricity, in electrical form
 "Hydro", AC mains electricity in parts of Canada

Utilities

Australia 

 Snowy Hydro
 Hydro Tasmania

Canada 

 Canadian Hydro Developers (not specific to  a province)
 In Manitoba:
 Manitoba Hydro
 Winnipeg Hydro, Manitoba
 In Ontario:
 Ontario Hydro
 Hydro One
 Hydro Ottawa
 Toronto Hydro
 Specific to other provinces:
 BC Hydro, British Columbia
 Newfoundland and Labrador Hydro
 Hydro-Québec

Europe 

 Norsk Hydro, in Norway
 Scottish Hydro Electric

Other uses 
 Hydro (fuel-station chain), in Sweden
 SF Hydro, former Norwegian railway ferry

Places 

 Hydro, Oklahoma, United States
 Hydro, Ontario, Canada

Personal names 

 "Hydro", professional wrestler Jamar Shipman

Buildings 

 Hydro, a term for a hydropathic establishment, often preserved in the names of hotels that no longer offer the water cure
 Hydro Majestic Hotel, New South Wales, Australia
 OVO Hydro, arena in Glasgow, Scotland

See also
 Hydra (disambiguation)
Hydroponics